Sonora is a genus of small harmless colubrid snakes commonly referred to as ground snakes, which are endemic to North America.

Distribution and habitat
Species of the genus Sonora range through central and northern Mexico, and the southwestern United States.

They are sand dwellers.

Species

References

External links

Further reading
Baird SF, Girard CF (1853). Catalogue of North American Reptiles in the Museum of the Smithsonian Institution. Part I.—Serpents. Washington, District of Columbia: Smithsonian Institution. xvi + 172 pp. (Sonora, new genus, p. 117).
Conant R (1975). A Field Guide to Reptiles and Amphibians of Eastern and Central North America, Second Edition. Boston: Houghton Mifflin.  xviii + 429 pp.  (hardcover),  (paperback). (Genus Sonora, p. 213).
Schmidt KP, Davis DD (1941). Field Book of Snakes of the United States and Canada. New York: G.P. Putnam's Sons. 365 pp. (Genus Sonora, p. 197).
Smith HM, Brodie ED Jr (1982). Reptiles of North America: A Guide to Field Identification. New York: Golden Press. 240 pp.  (paperback). (Genus Sonora, p. 166).

Sonora (snake)
Snake genera
Taxa named by Spencer Fullerton Baird
Taxa named by Charles Frédéric Girard